GoDurham, formerly Durham Area Transit Authority (DATA), is the public transit system serving Durham, North Carolina. It was rebranded under the consolidated GoTransit branding scheme for the Research Triangle region.

History 
The City of Durham assumed the operation of the local Duke Power bus system in 1991, naming it Durham Area Transit Authority (DATA).
 1891–1902 – Durham Street Railway Co.
 1902–1913 – Durham Traction Co.
 1913–1921 – Durham Traction Co. (Cities Service Co.)
 1921–1943 – Durham Public Service Co. (Cities Service Co.)
 1930 – streetcars discontinued
 After 1943 – Duke Power Company 
In 2011, DATA, along with GoTriangle began to redesign all of DATA's existing routes. This is based on the Designing Better Bus Service project, which is offered by Triangle Transit. Many wanted better service, such as on-time performance, better bus range, and enhanced bus stops. These new routes debuted in September 2014.

In 2015, as part of the GoTransit naming scheme, DATA was renamed GoDurham. Total ridership, for the fiscal year 2015 was almost 6.3 million ridership. The downtown terminal was relocated to a new transportation center (Durham Station) that also serves GoTriangle and Greyhound Lines buses on February 23, 2009. The building was designed by the Freelon group.

Fares & Service Hours 
Currently GoDurham is fare-free until summer 2023.

Almost all routes arrive at Durham Station during the :00 and :30 times. However, some routes arrive at the :15 and :45 mark.

Service operates from 5:30 am to 12:30 am on Monday to Saturday and from 6:30 am to 9:30 pm on Sunday. Sunday-level service is operated during New Years, MLK Jr. Day, Memorial Day, Independence Day, Labor Day, and Thanksgiving Day. 

There is no service on Christmas Day. Service operates on Christmas Eve, however, service ends at 7:30 pm.

Fleet 
The fixed-route system currently operates around 60 buses on 21 routes transporting more than 15,900 riders per week. The paratransit system includes 43 vans transporting clients to various places within the city and nearby Chapel Hill. GoDurham currently operates Gillig Low Floor buses for its fixed-route service and Goshen cutaway buses for paratransit services.

The fleet livery changed throughout the years. The first livery, prior to 2003, had buses uses double blue stripes over a white body. However, with the introduction of Gillig Low Floors in 2003, buses used a white body with red, yellow, and blue stripes. However, in 2010 with the delivery of Gillig BRTs, a new livery was made, featuring a brighter color, arc scheme on the buses. Bicycle racks are fitted to the front of all buses to increase efforts for public transit. On September 2009, 20 Gillig BRT Hybrids were delivered to DATA to help efforts for clean-energy buses in the city. Due to the rebranding of DATA to GoDurham, the livery was overhauled to the new branding, with a gray body and blue triangles with different hues on the back. On Earth Day 2021, GoDurham acquired two electric buses to begin their electric bus campaign. GoDurham is expected to receive more electric buses by 2024, but will still acquire diesel buses for the time being.

As of October 2022, here is the current bus roster,

Routes

Current Routes 
The service list for GoDurham are as follows. These are the current routes as of October 2022. See GoDurham site for more information. 

Some services are operated under the Frequent Service Network program, which provides 15-minute service during daytime hours and 30-minute service during evenings and weekends on select routes. All routes end in Durham Station, except for route 20.

Former Routes 
These routes have either been merged into one route or discontinued due to DATA's bus redesign on September 27th, 2014. 

Bold means these routes remained from the DATA takeover in 1991. However, were affected by the plan. The list will not mention any existing routes that were either cut/extended and routes suspended due to the COVID-19 pandemic.

Future

GoDurham Better Bus Project 
The GoDurham Better Bus Project is a program created in 2019 by the City of Durham to plan and improve current bus stops, crosswalks, and roads to both make bus stops more comfortable for riders and to speed up GoDurham service. The 18-month plan, which has six projects plans to improve major corridor routes, more attention on both Holloway Street and Fayetteville Street bus lines.

Currently, GoDurham's planned projects are shown here, expected to be planned and finished by 2023-2024:

 Bus Access Project - Will allow easier access to bus stops by adding sidewalks 1/4th mile from a GoDurham bus stop.
 Bus Speed and Reliability Project - Allows for the improvement of bus service by prioritizing buses in traffic, pavement markings, and better signage.
 Durham Station Transit Area - This project will evaluate current streets in Downtown Durham taken by GoDurham buses and improving those streets to speed up service to/from Durham Station
 Fayetteville Street Corridor - This project would allow major improvements around Fayetteville Street like enhanced bus stops, better traffic, and safer access which will increase reliability, safety, and will speed up the route.
 Holloway Street Corridor and Village Transit Center - This project will allow the same enhancements on Holloway Street. This will also allow major upgrades on The Village Shopping Center.
 Bus Stop Balancing Study - Will remove low ridership stops and modify existing stops to increase service reliability.

Durham Transit Plan 
The Durham Transit Plan is the plan for GoDurham's long-term future bus improvements for the city by 2040. In April 2011, Durham County added a sales tax for public transit to allow this plan to happen. This plans allows for the improvement of bus stops, acquire electric vehicles, and increased 30 and 15-minute service. Durham was recently awarded $10.8 million in funding, which will allow GoDurham to advance with this plan.

Current Progress 
The program is currently in its middle phase. This has affected the system already. Current changes since November 2022 are:

 Creating brand new bus terminals in The Streets at Southpoint and Glenview Station as part of their Bus Stop Improvement program.
 Improving 90 bus stops with benches and/or adding shelters. 
 Order six electric buses, two of them have since been delivered.
 Increasing 30-minute service on overnights and Sundays on routes 1, 2, 4, 3, 5, 10, and 11.
 Adding all or some 15-minute service or Frequent Service Network on routes 5, 3/3B/3C, 2/12/12B, and 11/11B.
 Microtransit on the East and North Durham Zones.

Future Progress 
The Final Plan is currently done. It will await voting later in the year and will be implemented by summer 2023.

Funding has been approved for these services, which the changes could happen in a year. These changes would be:

 Create a crosstown route connecting Duke/VA Hospitals and Duke Regional Hospital. (route 16)
 Extend service on routes 9A/9B to midnight, thus route 9 service would only run partially in Saturday and only run all day on Sunday.
 Improve 75 bus stops are scheduled to be improved, with 114 more being planned.
 Increase frequency on route 3 and add midday service on GoTriangle's 405 route.

These are the planned changes for the next five years. These are:
 Increase all service to 30-minute frequency during weekdays, evening, and weekends
 Create a crosstown route (route 17) between The Village and NCCU.
 Add route 4 and 9 to the Frequent Service Network program.
 Increase service to GoTriangle's 400 and 700 routes.
 Extend route 4 to Danube/Herbon.
 Help fund GoTriangle's commuter rail project.
 Rebuild Durham Station, which will provide double the lanes, weather prevention improvements, and increased security.
These other ideas are being considered to be added in the far future. These include:
 Create a transit center in North Duke Crossing [4/9/9A/9B]
 Acquire more buses for increased service.
 Relocate GoTriangle's Regional Transit Center.
 Extend Chapel Hill Transit's D route to Patterson Place.
 Provide ideas for North Durham [4/9/9A/9B/16] and Chapel Hill Rd [10/10B] Transit Corridors.

References

External links 

Official webpage
GoTransit
Freelon Design for the Transportation Center
Downtown Terminal Groundbreaking Announcement
Roster

Bus transportation in North Carolina
Transportation in Durham, North Carolina